Great Yarmouth is a constituency represented in the House of Commons of the Parliament of the United Kingdom. Its MP is Brandon Lewis, the current Secretary of State for Justice and Lord Chancellor, who has held the seat since the 2010 general election. He was previously the Chairman of the Conservative Party and Secretary of State for Northern Ireland.

History 
The Parliamentary Borough of Great Yarmouth had been represented by 2 MPs since 1295 and was unaffected by the Great Reform Act of 1832. However, the borough was disenfranchised for corruption by the Reform Act 1867, when its voters were absorbed into the North Division of the Parliamentary County of Norfolk. The seat was re-established as a single-member Borough by the Redistribution of Seats Act 1885 and remained unchanged until the Representation of the People Act 1948, which came into effect for the 1950 general election. This abolished the Parliamentary Borough and replaced it with the County Constituency of Yarmouth, which incorporated the County Borough and surrounding rural areas. Further to the local government reorganisation of 1974, which was reflected in the redistribution of seats which came into effect for the 1983 general election, the constituency was renamed Great Yarmouth and its boundaries coincided with those of the local authority of the Borough of Great Yarmouth. It has remained unchanged since then.

Boundaries and boundary changes

1885–1918: The municipal borough of Great Yarmouth, including the parish of Gorleston, and part of the parish of Runham.

1918–1950: The County Borough of Great Yarmouth.

1950–1974: The County Borough of Great Yarmouth, and the Rural District of Blofield and Flegg except the civil parishes of Great and Little Plumstead, Postwick, and Thorpe-next-Norwich (later renamed Thorpe St Andrew).

The parts of the Rural District of Blofield and Flegg had previously been included in the abolished Eastern Division of Norfolk.

1974–1983: The County Borough of Great Yarmouth, and the Rural District of Blofield and Flegg.

The remaining parishes of the Rural District of Blofield and Flegg were transferred from the abolished County Constituency of Central Norfolk.

1983–present: The Borough of Great Yarmouth.

Thorpe St Andrew was transferred to Norwich North and remaining western parts to the new County Constituency of Mid Norfolk.  Gained a small area from the Suffolk constituency of Lowestoft, including Bradwell, which had been transferred to Norfolk as a result of the local government reorganisation of 1974, as laid out in the Local Government Act 1972.

The constituency covers the area in and around Great Yarmouth in Norfolk. Despite its rural area, there is a substantial amount of industry in the constituency.

Members of Parliament

Great Yarmouth borough
Great Yarmouth was a 2-seat constituency from 1660 until 1868 when it was disenfranchised. It was recreated for the 1885 general election as a single-seat constituency.

MPs 1295–1640

MPs 1640–1868

MPs 1885–1950
 1885: Constituency revived, electing only a single member

Yarmouth County Constituency

MPs 1950–1974

Great Yarmouth County Constituency

MPs since 1983

Elections

Elections in the 2010s

Elections in the 2000s

Elections in the 1990s

Elections in the 1980s

Elections in the 1970s

Elections in the 1960s

Election in the 1950s

Elections in the 1940s

Elections in the 1930s

Elections in the 1920s

Elections in the 1910s

* Wilson - who stood as a 'Patriotic Trade Unionist's and Seamen's' candidate - supported the Coalition Government and was supported by the National Sailors' and Firemen's Union. He claimed to have been adopted by both the Liberal Party and National Democratic and Labour Party, but only appeared on the former's official list.
** Dawson initially was endorsed by the National Federation of Discharged and Demobilized Sailors and Soldiers who then repudiated him.

Election results 1885-1918

Elections in the 1880s

Elections in the 1890s

Elections in the 1900s

Elections in the 1910s 

General Election 1914–15:

Another General Election was required to take place before the end of 1915. The political parties had been making preparations for an election to take place and by July 1914, the following candidates had been selected; 
Unionist: Arthur Fell
Liberal:

Election results 1832-1868

Elections in the 1830s

 

 
 

 
 

Wilshere resigned, causing a by-election.

Elections in the 1840s

 

 

The election of Lennox and Coope was declared void on petition on 14 February 1848 due to bribery, causing a by-election.

Elections in the 1850s

 

 

 

The election was declared void on petition due to bribery by McCullagh and Watkin's agents, causing a by-election.

Elections in the 1860s 

 

Extensive bribery was found in the seat and its right to return a member was lost. It was then incorporated into East Suffolk and North Norfolk.

Elections before 1832

See also
 List of parliamentary constituencies in Norfolk
 Yarmouth (Isle of Wight) (UK Parliament constituency)

References

Sources
 Robert Beatson, A Chronological Register of Both Houses of Parliament (London: Longman, Hurst, Res & Orme, 1807) A Chronological Register of Both Houses of the British Parliament, from the Union in 1708, to the Third Parliament of the United Kingdom of Great Britain and Ireland, in 1807
 D Brunton & D H Pennington, Members of the Long Parliament (London: George Allen & Unwin, 1954)
 Cobbett's Parliamentary history of England, from the Norman Conquest in 1066 to the year 1803 (London: Thomas Hansard, 1808) titles A-Z
 The Constitutional Year Book for 1913 (London: National Union of Conservative and Unionist Associations, 1913)
 F W S Craig, British Parliamentary Election Results 1832-1885 (2nd edition, Aldershot: Parliamentary Research Services, 1989)
 F W S Craig, British Parliamentary Election Results 1918-1949 (Glasgow: Political Reference Publications, 1969)
 Maija Jansson (ed.), Proceedings in Parliament, 1614 (House of Commons) (Philadelphia: American Philosophical Society, 1988) Proceedings in Parliament, 1614 (House of Commons)
 J E Neale, The Elizabethan House of Commons (London: Jonathan Cape, 1949)

Parliamentary constituencies in Norfolk
Politics of the Borough of Great Yarmouth
Constituencies of the Parliament of the United Kingdom established in 1295
Constituencies of the Parliament of the United Kingdom disestablished in 1868
Constituencies of the Parliament of the United Kingdom established in 1885